In sociology, the master status is the social position that is the primary identifying characteristic of an individual. The term master status is defined as "a status that has exceptional importance for social identity, often shaping a person's entire life." Master status can be ascribed or achieved.

Ascribed statuses are statuses born with—e.g., race, sex, etc. Achieved statuses are gained throughout life—e.g., mom, athlete, spouse, etc. When one of these statuses overpowers the others it can be determined as one's master status.

Origin 
Everett Hughes first introduced the notion of master status in the 1940s, and it was the key subject of his address as the 53rd president of the American Sociological Association. In this address, he discussed "the tendency of observers to believe that one label or demographic category is more significant than any other aspect of the observed person's background, behavior or performance", with special reference to race.   Everett Hughes presented the concept of Master Status in an article, “Dilemmas and Contradictions of Status” in the American Journal of Sociology. While his concept was influential, the term master status wasn't cited regularly until the 1970s. While it often perceives master status as negative, like race or gender discrimination, this isn't always the case (occupation status, for example).

Description 

The master status is often the most important architecture of individual identity. Common characteristics are those of race or ethnicity, sex, sexual orientation, physical ability, age, economic standing, religion or spirituality, and education. Others include raising children, employment status; and disability or mental illness.

In perception, an individual's master status supersedes other identifying traits; for example, if a woman feels that her role as a mother is more important than her role as a woman, a daughter, etc., she is more likely to identify herself as a mother and to identify with other women who label themselves as such. An individual's master status dominates how they are perceived by others and their behavior towards them. More than other aspects of the status set, the master status affects how the individual behaves and how others behave with respect to them.

Master status in society 
Master status can be seen in everyday life (e.g., gendered bathrooms, handicapped signs, fame, occupation, etc.). These identities often control individual interactions. People may treat one differently depending on their master status. These examples are often social constructs that humans create to understand the world we live in.

Criminal courts' decision making based on master status 

From data taken on about 370 different criminal court case decisions, studies have focused on the creation of a master status based on gang membership and the influence that has on charging and sentencing decisions. Various statuses such as “drug addict,” “mentally ill,” “child abuser,” “alcoholic,” and “ex-convict” have a big impact on decision-making. Statuses like these modify personal identity and limit alternatives and opportunities in the eyes of those in charge of sentencing. Stereotypes and master statuses can not be confused because while a stereotype indicates in this scenario that the observer is the one who filters any additional information about the case at hand, a master status heavily influences any final decisions made even when other information may be relevant. Over the years, gang and non-gang offenses have been carefully looked at because of this master status notion.

Effects of master status throughout history

Plessy vs. Ferguson 
In this court case, race was evident as a master status, as the Supreme Court upheld racial segregation allowing advantages to white individuals. It occurred after African American Homer Plessy refused to sit in a car for blacks. The court ruled that a law that “implies merely a legal distinction” between color was "not unconstitutional.” This distinction is an example of a master status, in this case discrimination occurs due to ones master status.

Right to vote 
Until 1920, women were prohibited from voting in elections. This exemplifies the master status of sex as it overpowered other aspects of a woman's identity. Allowing women to vote limited the power of this master status.

References

External links 
 
 
 Scott, Lisa-Jo K van den, and Deborah K van den Hoonard. “The Origins and Evolution of Everett Hughes's Concept: 'Master Status' (Chapter Seven) - The Anthem Companion to Everett Hughes.” Cambridge Core, Anthem Press,
 History.com Editors. “Plessy v. Ferguson.” History.com, A&E Television Networks, 29 Oct. 2009,
 Lin, Nan. “Social Networks and Status Attainment.” Annual Review of Sociology, vol. 25, 1999, pp. 467–487. JSTOR,
 Pierce, Albert. “On the Concepts of Role and Status.” Sociologus, vol. 6, no. 1, 1956, pp. 29–34. JSTOR
 Ridgeway, Cecilia. “The Social Construction of Status Value: Gender and Other Nominal Characteristics.” Social Forces, vol. 70, no. 2, 1991, pp. 367–386. Dictionary of the Social Sciences.

Sociological terminology
Role status